This is a list of election results for the electoral district of Hindmarsh in South Australian elections.

Members for Hindmarsh

Legislative Council
Hindmarsh had earlier been the name of a different electoral district for the unicameral South Australian Legislative Council from 1851 until its abolition in 1857, Robert Davenport, then John Rankine being the members. That electorate had been for an area south of Adelaide including Strathalbyn.

House of Assembly

Election results

Elections in the 1960s

Elections in the 1950s

Elections in the 1940s

 Preferences were not distributed.

Elections in the 1930s

References

South Australian state electoral results by district